Mayfield, historically Ballinamought, is a suburb on the north-side of Cork City, Ireland. Mayfield is part of the Cork North-Central (Dáil constituency).

Origins of name
The town was originally called Baile na mBocht, which scholars believe translates from the Gaelic more properly as "Town of the Poorly" rather than "Town of the Poor", as Baile na mBocht was the site of a medieval Leper Colony. While a wide array of skin diseases were called Leprosy in Ireland, it is doubtful the victims actually had Leprosy itself. The "Poorly" would walk from Baile na mBocht down to the River Lee to bathe their diseased skin, along a path  known as "Leper's Walk".

Geography
Mayfield is bounded to the north by the Glen River Valley, an aquiferous geological formation produced by a receding glacier during the last ice age. This area contains some unique habitats, flora and fauna, including the small cudweed and the sand martin, a migratory bird species that returns from North Africa each spring to breed in the porous sand cliffs along sections of the river valley north. In recent years, these endangered birds have been studied by the European Union which found that the local planning authorities and the Irish Government had violated various EU Bird and Habitats Directives in 2004 following the destruction of nesting sites and ecosystems by building developers.

Notable people
 Michael Davitt, Poet
 Dara Murphy, Lord Mayor of Cork between 2009-2010 
 Roy Keane, Irish footballer, was born and grew up in Mayfield
 James Coughlan, Irish rugby union player for Munster
 Kieran 'Fraggy' Murphy, former Cork senior hurling captain

See also
 List of towns and villages in Ireland

References 

Geography of Cork (city)